Michael John Kotsakas Kratsios (born November 7, 1986) is an American business executive and government official. He served as the fourth Chief Technology Officer of the United States at the White House Office of Science and Technology Policy. In this role, Kratsios served as President Donald Trump's top technology advisor.  From July 10, 2020 to January 20, 2021, Kratsios was also the Acting Under Secretary of Defense for Research and Engineering.

Education
Kratsios' family is from Volissos, Chios, and the city of Kastoria, both in Greece. He graduated from Richland Northeast High School in Columbia, South Carolina, in 2004. He then studied at Princeton University and graduated with a B.A. in politics and a certificate in Hellenic studies in 2008. Kratsios completed a 125-page long senior thesis, titled "Economics and Voting in the Third Hellenic Republic: An Aggregate and Individual-Level Analysis of the Greek Electorate, 1985-2007," under the supervision of Markus Prior. He was a visiting scholar at Tsinghua University in Beijing.

Career
While in college, Kratsios was an intern for U.S. Senator Lindsey Graham and editor-in-chief and president of Business Today. Following his time at Princeton, he worked for Barclays Capital and Lyford Group International, and later served as the chief financial officer of Clarium Capital Management.

Prior to joining the Trump administration as deputy assistant to the president, Kratsios was a principal at Thiel Capital and served as chief of staff to entrepreneur and venture capitalist Peter Thiel.

White House
Kratsios joined the White House in 2017 as Deputy Assistant to the President for Technology Policy. In March 2019, the White House announced that President Trump would nominate Kratsios as the next U.S. CTO and an associate director of the Office of Science and Technology Policy. On August 1, 2019, the U.S. Senate voted unanimously to confirm him as the fourth U.S. CTO.

At the White House, Kratsios advocated for the promotion of emerging technologies in the United States. Under his leadership, the White House hosted the American Leadership in Emerging Technology Summit during the Administration's Technology Week in June 2017, kicking off a multi-year effort to prioritize domains in which the United States must ensure technological preeminence to maintain a strong economy and safeguard national security.

Kratsios led administration efforts on artificial intelligence and quantum information science. Kratsios is the architect of the American AI Initiative, the national strategy for promoting American leadership in AI. He also oversaw the implementation of the bipartisan National Quantum Initiative Act, including the establishment of a new National Quantum Coordination Office in the White House. In August 2020, Kratsios announced a billion dollar investment in research institutes to advance AI and quantum R&D in the United States. Kratsios was responsible for developing a first-of-its-kind set set of regulatory principles to govern AI development in the private sector. In January 2020, Kratsios announced the establishment of the National AI Initiative Office at the White House. He also led the White House effort to integrate drones into the national airspace system, resulting in a presidential memorandum signed October 25, 2017, that called for the establishment of the Unmanned Aircraft Systems (UAS) Integration Pilot Program.

In March 2020, Kratsios launched the COVID-19 High Performance Computing Consortium, the largest public-private computing partnership ever created, to match researchers with the world’s most powerful computing resources, accelerating the pace of scientific discovery in the fight against the virus.

Kratsios has represented the United States as Head of Delegation at a number of international fora, including G7 Technology Ministerials in Turin, Montreal, and Paris, and G20 Digital Economic Ministerials in Salta, Argentina and Tsukuba, Japan. He worked with U.S. allies, including in the G7, to counter China in AI policy, and during his tenure, the U.S. joined the Global Partnership on AI.

Kratsios also led U.S. efforts at the OECD to develop the OECD Recommendations on AI, the world's first intergovernmental policy guidelines for AI.

Department of Defense

On July 13, 2020, the U.S. Department of Defense announced Kratsios would serve as its Acting Under Secretary of Defense for Research and Engineering. In this role, Kratsios served as the third highest ranking official at the Department of Defense and the principal advisor to the Secretary of Defense for technology, supervising all defense research and engineering, technology development, technology transition, prototyping activities, experimentation, and developmental testing activities and programs. Kratsios also oversaw the Defense Advanced Research Projects Agency, the Missile Defense Agency, the Defense Innovation Unit, the Space Development Agency, and the DOD laboratory enterprise. Kratsios managed a $106 billion research and development budget, the largest in the world.

Kratsios has advocated for the Department to better leverage its unique testing authorities to accelerate innovation, to strengthen its research and development partnerships with startups and smaller innovators, and to enhance its strategic R&D collaboration with America's international allies. Kratsios led the Department’s efforts to accelerate the adoption of 5G, and in October 2020, announced $600 million in awards for 5G experimentation and testing at five U.S. military test sites, representing the largest full-scale 5G tests for dual-use applications in the world.

Kratsios has also advocated for greater participation of historically black colleges and universities (HBCUs) and minority serving institutions (MSIs) in the defense industrial base. In September 2020, Kratsios announced $50 million in grants to HBCUs and MSIs to conduct research in defense priority areas.

Scale AI Inc. 
In March 2021, Kratsios joined data management startup Scale AI Inc. as its managing director and head of strategy, which is a new role within the company.

Recognition
Kratsios was included in Fortune Magazine’s “40 Under 40” list in 2019 and was honored as a Young Global Leader by the World Economic Forum in 2020. Kratsios is the recipient of the Department of Defense Medal for Distinguished Public Service, the highest honorary award which can be conferred on a non-career Federal employee or private citizen. Kratsios was also awarded the Archbishop Iakovos Leadership 100 Award for Excellence by the Greek Orthodox Archdiocese of America in 2020.

Kratsios has been published in The Wall Street Journal, The Washington Post, Wired,Bloomberg, Fortune, and CNN.

References

External links

Biography at the White House
Biography at the U.S. Department of Defense

1986 births
American people of Greek descent
Living people
Office of Science and Technology Policy officials
People from Columbia, South Carolina
Princeton University alumni
Trump administration personnel
United States Under Secretaries of Defense